Ingham is a rural town and locality in the Shire of Hinchinbrook, Queensland, Australia.  It is named after William Bairstow Ingham and is the administrative centre for the Shire of Hinchinbrook.

Geography
The town is positioned about 17 km inland within the Herbert River floodplain where Palm Creek drains the low-lying lands. It is surrounded by sugar cane farms which are serviced by a number of private railways

The North Coast railway line passes through the town, which is served by the Ingham railway station. The Bruce Highway also passes through the town.

Tokalon is neighbourhood in the south-east of the locality. It takes its name from the Tokalon railway station, which was named by the Queensland Railways Department on 24 December 1924, from the name of a local selection. Tokalan is an Aboriginal word meaning beautiful land.

History

Aboriginal history
Prior to European settlement, the Ingham area was inhabited by the Warakamai People. Warrgamay (also known as Waragamai, Wargamay, Wargamaygan, Biyay, and Warakamai) is an Australian Aboriginal language in North Queensland. The language region includes the Herbert River area, Ingham, Hawkins Creek, Long Pocket, Herbert Vale, Niagara Vale, Yamanic Creek, Herbert Gorge, Cardwell, Hinchinbrook Island and the adjacent mainland.

British colonisation
George Elphinstone Dalrymple led the first British expedition to the area during his 1864 journey from Cardwell to the Valley of Lagoons Station. Dalrymple named the Herbert River on this expedition and described both the extensive grassy plains that flanked the river and the "tribe of wild blacks" who lived upon the them. Co-owner of Valley of Lagoons, Walter Jervoise Scott, soon established the Herbert Vale cattle station on these plains which was managed by Henry Worsley Stone and Duncan McAuslan. In 1868, the region was opened to further uptake of land by colonists, with Daniel Cudmore and Maurice Geoffrey O'Connell being the most prominent selectors.

This taking of land led to conflict between the British colonists and the resident Indigenous population of the region. In the early 1870s, Native Police forces based at Waterview under the charge of Sub-Inspectors Thomas Coward and Ferdinand Macquarie Tompson, conducted missions to "disperse" groups of "very troublesome" Aboriginal people along the Herbert River. Cattle continued to be speared and in 1872 a Native Police detachment captured a group of Aborigines at Daniel Cudmore's property. They were made to gather firewood and were then shot, their corpses being burnt on the gathered wood. In 1873, the local Native Police barracks were moved to Fort Herbert (just west of the modern day town of Ingham) and placed under the command of Sub-Inspector Robert Arthur Johnstone. Over the next seven years, Johnstone conducted numerous punitive expeditions, "dispersing mobs" of Aboriginal people around the Herbert River region. James Cassady, a colonist who attempted to protect Aborigines in the region, described how Native Police officers during this period would order the shootings of peaceful Aboriginal people. In once instance, two young boys who survived these shootings were taken and given as presents to other colonists. The Native Police forces in the Ingham region were disbanded in 1881.

Sugar plantations and mills
The region was found to be ideal for the cultivation of sugarcane and Maurice Geoffrey O'Connell is regarded as the first to plant the crop in the Herbert River area. He, however, soon committed suicide and other entrepreneurs expanded the industry. In 1870, James MacKenzie established the Gairloch plantation, Farrand Haig and Henry Miles founded the Bemerside plantation, while Arthur Neame and Edwin Waller established the Macknade plantation. The first local sugar mill was constructed in 1872 at the Gairloch property, with the Bemerside and Macknade mills opening the following year. These operations came into financial difficulty and the Hamleigh Sugar Company with Alfred Cowley as manager became the dominant sugar enterprise in the region by 1883. However, with significant government assistance, the Colonial Sugar Refining Company (CSR) monopolised the Hebert valley sugar production by 1886, purchasing most of the plantations, buying the Macknade mill and establishing its own mill in 1883 at the Victoria Plantation. The Macknade and Victoria mills are still in operation and are owned by Wilmar Sugar Australia.

Most of the labour on these plantations during the early years was performed by imported South Sea Islanders who were required to work for three years earning only £6 per annum which was paid out at the end of the contract, often in cheap goods instead of money. At CSR's Victoria Plantation, the Islanders wore a tin disc around theirs necks with a number stamped on it and although they were provided with a hospital, the amount of sickness and death among them was very high, the mortality rate in 1884 being up to 15%. The hospital itself was a temporary structure in which the Islanders were locked in unattended at night. There is a recorded incident where a fight broke out, resulting in a death and mass injury.

In 1885, a Royal Commission found that Islanders destined to work at Alfred Cowley's Hamleigh Plantation were blackbirded in that they were recruited in a way that was "cruelly deceptive and altogether illegal". Likewise, the Commission found that many Islanders were deliberately kidnapped or murdered during a recruiting voyage for CSR's Victoria Plantation, describing it as a record of deceit, cruel treachery and inhuman slaughter. In 1886, both the CSR and Hamleigh companies received government compensation for the removal and repatriation of some of the Islanders who had survived these recruiting events. This money was given despite an inquiry showing that the annual death rate of South Sea Islanders was as high as 17.5% at both these plantations. The use of Islander labour continued on the Herbert River valley until the early 1900s.

Township of Ingham

A cluster of a few huts known simply as Lower Herbert was established in 1871 which included a post office. A township was gazetted on this site in 1879 and named Ingham, after William Bairstow Ingham, a pioneer sugar planter on the Herbert River.

Ingham State School opened on 4 May 1885 and celebrated its Golden Jubilee (50th anniversary) in December 1935. On Saturday 4 May 1985, the school celebrated its centenary by planting a tree at the school's original location.

A gaol opened in July 1886; previously there had only been a police lock-up.

The town has a strong Italian and Spanish history with the 1920s and 1930s seeing a large influx of immigrants from these countries. The Black Hand Gang, made up of some of these immigrants, terrorised the town in the 1930s with bribery and corruption, forming a  dark chapter in the town's history.

Ingham State High School opened on 2 February 1952.

Hinchinbrook Shire Library opened in 2011 in Ingham.

Following the devastation caused by Cyclone Yasi in Far North Queensland in February 2011, Ingham is one of a number of towns where a cyclone shelter was built. The building serves as a multi-purpose sports facility for the Ingham State High School while in a cyclone it provides shelter for up to 800 people. The shelter was opened by Premier Campbell Newman in January 2013.

In March 2018, flood waters inundated properties in Ingham following heavy rain.

Demographics
Aboriginal and Torres Strait Islander people made up 7.6% of the population. 81.2% of people were born in Australia. The next most common country of birth was Italy at 5.0%. 82.5% of people spoke only English at home. Other languages spoken at home included Italian at 7.2%. The most common responses for religion were Catholic 45.8%, Anglican 15.5%, No Religion 13.1%.

Heritage listings
Ingham has a number of heritage-listed sites, including:
 Old Bruce Highway: Gairloch Bridge
 15 Lannercost Street: Ingham Post Office
 5 Lynch Street: Ruth Fairfax House
 35-39 Palm Terrace: Ingham Court House

Climate
Ingham has a tropical monsoon climate (Köppen climate classification Am). Like the rest of Far North Queensland, it has a very humid and hot wet season that runs from November to April and a very warm and less humid dry season that runs from May to October. Ingham is part of the Queensland Wet Tropics bioregion.

Economy 
Ingham is the service centre for many sugarcane plantations, which are serviced by the two sugar mills located in the Ingham district: Victoria Sugar Mill (located approximately 6 km from Ingham), which is the largest sugar mill in Australia and one of the largest in the southern hemisphere, and Macknade Mill, which is the oldest operating sugar mill in Queensland.  Both mills are owned and operated by Wilmar Sugar Australia Limited. The majority of the cane is transported to the mills by light tramlines. Once processed by the mills, the raw sugar is then transported by tramline to the bulk sugar terminal at the nearby seaside port of Lucinda and loaded onto ships for export via the longest pier in the southern hemisphere (4.75 km long).

Other industries in the Ingham area include cattle, watermelons, rice, horticulture, fishing, timber and tourism.

Education 
Ingham State School is a government primary (Early Childhood-6) school for boys and girls at 28 McIlwraith Street. In 2018, the school had an enrolment of 334 students with 29 teachers (24 full-time equivalent) and 25 non-teaching staff (13 full-time equivalent). It includes a special education program.

Our Lady of Lourdes Primary School is a Catholic primary (Prep-6) school for boys and girls at 18 Abbott Street. In 2018, the school had an enrolment of 288 students with 20 teachers (18 full-time equivalent) and 17 non-teaching staff (10 full-time equivalent).

Hinchinbrook Christian School is a private primary and secondary (Prep-10) school for boys and girls at 77 Halifax Road. In 2018, the school had an enrolment of 13 students with 3 teachers and 0 non-teaching staff. The school also provides distance education.

Ingham State High School is a government secondary (7-12) school for boys and girls at 12 Menzies Street. In 2018, the school had an enrolment of 425 students with 47 teachers (45 full-time equivalent) and 26 non-teaching staff (19 full-time equivalent). It includes a special education program.

Gilroy Santa Maria College is a Catholic secondary (7-12) school for boys and girls at 17 Chamberlain Street. In 2018, the school had an enrolment of 291 students with 33 teachers (29 full-time equivalent) and 26 non-teaching staff (18 full-time equivalent).

Amenities
The town is home to the regional art gallery called TYTO Regional Art Gallery which sits alongside the Tyto Wetlands and Enrico's Restaurant. In the same precinct is the Hinchinbrook Shire Library located at 73-75 McIllwraith Street.

Media 
The Herbert River Express is a newspaper published in Ingham since 1904.

Attractions
Wallaman Falls are about 40 km to the west of the town. Hinchinbrook Island is about 20 km north of Ingham.

Events 
The Australian-Italian Festival is held in Ingham the first weekend in August each year and is one of the most popular events in the region, with thousands of people attending the event. The festival celebrates Ingham's cultural background, dating from the 1890s, when the first Italian immigrants came to the region. More than half the population of the town are of Italian descent. The town is known as "Little Italy".

The annual festival, held at Tyto Wetlands, began as an idea from a community workshop. Many Italians visit from Italy to celebrate the event, reinforcing the cultural ties between the inhabitants of Ingham and Italy.

Notable residents 
Notable individuals born in Ingham include:

 Sam Backo (rugby league)
 Harriett Brims, (pioneer female photographer)
 David Crisafulli (Leader of the Liberal National Party and Leader of the Opposition in Queensland)
 Tracey Curro (journalist)
 Francis Patrick Donovan (Ambassador)
 Greg Dowling (rugby league)
 Nick Euclid (rugby league)
 Arthur Fadden (13th Prime Minister of Australia)
 Eric Feldt (Head of the Coastwatchers in WWII), born in Ingham
 Leonard Fraser (serial killer and sex offender), born in Ingham
 Beryl Friday, netballer
 Joice NanKivell Loch, humanitarian worker, born in Ingham
 Walter Mason (author)
 Keith Payne (Victoria Cross recipient)
 Ted Row (politician)
 Laurie Spina (rugby league)

See also

References

External links

 
 
 
Ingham region - Great Green Way
Hinchinbrook Shire Council
Hinchinbrook Shire Library
Australian-Italian Festival

 
North Queensland
Towns in Queensland
Populated places established in 1864
Shire of Hinchinbrook
1864 establishments in Australia
Localities in Queensland